Deriby is a rural locality (a village) in Frolovskoye Rural Settlement, Permsky District, Perm Krai, Russia. The population was 28 as of 2010. There is 1 street.

Geography 
Deriby is located 15 km southeast of Perm (the district's administrative centre) by road. Kostaryata is the nearest rural locality.

References 

Rural localities in Permsky District